Armada House (previously known as Nova House) is in Telephone Avenue, Off Baldwin Street, Bristol

It was built in 1903 by Henry Williams, and is now used as offices and a conference centre. It has been designated by English Heritage as a grade II listed building.

It was formerly the offices of the National Telephone Co.

In 1971 one room was equipped by Post Office Telecommunications as a Confravision studio.

From 1982 the second floor was used by British Telecommunications as "Telecom TAN", one of the first commercial call centres & messaging bureaux in the UK.

References

Gallery

External links 
 Armada House

Grade II listed buildings in Bristol
Houses completed in 1903